Mrówki may refer to the following places:
Mrówki, Greater Poland Voivodeship (west-central Poland)
Mrówki, Podlaskie Voivodeship (north-east Poland)
Mrówki, Warmian-Masurian Voivodeship (north Poland)